María Pilar Lima Gozálvez (born 21 November 1977) is a Spanish politician of the party Podemos. She served as a senator from 2015 to 2019 and was elected to  the Corts Valencianes in 2019. Deaf from birth, she was Spain's first deaf senator.

Biography
Lima was born in Valencia. She was deaf from birth, which her family discovered when she was two years old, and did not learn a sign language until the age of 16. She graduated in Social Work and became a sign language teacher. She did voluntary work for the Vicente Ferrer Foundation in Anantapur, India, where she trained sign language teachers. Lima is openly lesbian.

In 2015, Lima was nominated for the Senate of Spain by the Podemos group in the Corts Valencianes. She required sign language interpreters and prepared for her office by contacting deaf Members of the European Parliament.

Lima was elected to the Corts as list leader in the Valencia constituency in 2019, also becoming the Podemos spokesperson in the chamber, as the party formed the Generalitat Valenciana with Coalició Compromís and the Spanish Socialist Workers' Party (PSOE). In June 2020, she became the party's secretary general at regional level, with 44.7% of the votes. In November 2022, she became the Podemos candidate for mayor in the 2023 Valencia City Council election; the party had no seats in the council from the previous election in 2019.

References

1977 births
Living people
People from Valencia
Spanish deaf people
Deaf politicians
Lesbian politicians
LGBT legislators in Spain
Podemos (Spanish political party) politicians
Members of the 10th Senate of Spain
Members of the 11th Senate of Spain
Members of the 12th Senate of Spain
Members of the 10th Corts Valencianes